Kalle Kriit (born 13 November 1983 in Elva) is an Estonian professional racing cyclist who last rode for UCI Professional Continental Team . His nickname is Estonian Emperor.

Major results
2002
 1st  Under-23 National Road Race Championships
2005
 1st  Under-23 National Road Race Championships
2007
 1st Overall Kreiz Breizh Elites
1st Stages 1, 3 & 4
2008
 2nd National Road Race Championships
 5th Trophée des Grimpeurs
 8th Tartu GP
2010
 1st  National Road Race Championships
 9th Grand Prix d'Ouverture la Marseillaise

References

External links

1983 births
Living people
Estonian male cyclists
People from Elva, Estonia